My Bare Lady is a 2006 United Kingdom-based reality TV show that aired on the Fox Reality Channel.  The series followed four American female pornographic stars as they took acting lessons and performed in scenes from classic drama alongside British actors in London's West End.  The show was hosted by British actor/director Christopher Biggins and the girls were trained by Biggins and various other British theatre professionals, including Louie Spence of Pineapple Dance Studios fame.

The show is named after a 1963 film whose title is a pun recalling the Pygmalion-inspired musical My Fair Lady by Alan Jay Lerner and Frederick Loewe, popularized in a film adaptation starring Audrey Hepburn.

Cast

Season 1
Chanel St. James
Kirsten Price (winner)
Nautica Thorn
Sasha Knox

Auditioned (1st episode)
 Caren Caan
Gia Darling
Julia Bond
Mary Carey
Sunset Thomas
Taylor Wane
Sunny Lane
Sarah Blake
Angelique Morgan

Season 2
Based on the success of the debut season a second series was launched called "My Bare Lady 2: Open for Business." The series debuted on Fox Reality Channel on Saturday, November 8, 2008 and was divided into eight half-hour episodes. The show placed four adult entertainment stars in the same house for a month in Los Angeles and adopted a reality format similar to the first season to provide an in depth look at the daily goings on.  The cast competed in a series of tasks and challenges under the tutelage of top business coach Mike Mataraza in preparation for leading an existing business for one week.
Brooke Haven
Sunny Leone
Casey Parker

References

External links
 

2000s British reality television series
2000s American reality television series
2006 American television series debuts
2006 British television series debuts
2008 American television series endings
2008 British television series endings